Sergei Vinogradov may refer to:

Sergei Vinogradov (painter) (1869–1938), Russian painter and graphic artist
Sergei Vinogradov (journalist) (1958–2010), Russian journalist and translator
Sergei Vinogradov (footballer, born 1971), Russian footballer
Sergei Vinogradov (footballer, born 1981), Russian footballer
Sergei Vinogradov (diplomat) (1907–1970), Russian diplomat (Ambassador to France)
Sergei Vinogradov (director) (born 1965), Russian theatrical director